= Joseph Mandrillion =

Joseph Mandrillon (1743–January 1794) was a French banker and writer, and a member of the American Philosophical Society, elected in 1785.

Born in Bourg-en-Bresse, France, Mandrillon began working in finance and established himself in Amsterdam. Sometime before the Revolutionary War, he set out from the Netherlands to explore the United States, recording much of what he encountered on the continent. Years later, he published his musings back home in Amsterdam. His work, Le Spectateur Américain (1784) includes descriptions of his journey, along with a favorable portrait of George Washington. Mandrillon sent a copy to Washington in 1788 as part of a years-long amicable correspondence between the two men.

In 1785, he was elected as a member to the American Philosophical Society. His positive reputation, however, was amongst those in post-revolutionary America that did not translate to a warm reception in his country of birth, now in the throes of revolution. Returning to France, he wrote openly about his disillusionment concerning the state of affairs, to which French authorities arrested him for treasonable correspondence. Subsequently, Mandrillon died on 7 January 1794 under the guillotine during the reign of terror.
